Alexander Vikentyevich Skvortsov (August 28, 1954 – February 4, 2020) was a Russian ice hockey player who played for the Soviet Union at the Winter Olympics.  Skvortsov scored 2 goals during the 1980 games en route to a silver medal, and scored 4 goals in the 1984 games as the Soviets won the gold.  He was also a three-time world champion with the Soviet national team.

Career statistics

Regular season and playoffs

International

References

1954 births
2020 deaths
Ice hockey players at the 1980 Winter Olympics
Ice hockey players at the 1984 Winter Olympics
Medalists at the 1980 Winter Olympics
Medalists at the 1984 Winter Olympics
Olympic gold medalists for the Soviet Union
Olympic ice hockey players of the Soviet Union
Olympic medalists in ice hockey
Olympic silver medalists for the Soviet Union
Russian ice hockey left wingers
Soviet ice hockey left wingers
Sportspeople from Nizhny Novgorod